The Robert L.B. Tobin Land Bridge is a wildlife crossing over Wurzbach Parkway in San Antonio's Phil Hardberger Park that opened on December 11, 2020. The project cost $23 million and is designed for both wildlife and pedestrians. Construction began on November 26, 2018, and was originally expected to end in April 2020.

Design 
The bridge has a  underground cistern to keep the bridge's plants irrigated via rainwater.

On April 5, 2021, a footbridge called the Skywalk opened which starts at the top of the land bridge and winds through the park's trees.

Animals using the bridge 
Although animals had already been spotted crossing the bridge as of early 2021, wildlife traffic is not expected to substantially increase until the foliage planted on the bridge grows thicker.

As part of a five-year study, the Parks and Recreation Department documents wildlife using the bridge. , species include the Virginia opossum, cottaintail rabbit, white-tailed deer, coyote, rock squirrel, fox squirrel, rat, raccoon, armadillo, bobcat, gray fox, and axis deer.

See also 
 Wildlife crossing § Examples

References

External links 
 
 Map of the bridge

Pedestrian bridges in Texas
Bridges completed in 2020
Ecological restoration